Enregistrement public au Théâtre Le Palace is the first live album by Serge Gainsbourg, released in 1980. It was reissued in 1987 on CD, but with half the tracks removed. In 2006, a new release titled Gainsbourg... et cætera - Enregistrement public au Théâtre Le Palace featured the complete concert for the first time. The album exhibits his then reggae-influenced style.

Track listing 
All tracks composed by Serge Gainsbourg; except where noted.

Original album

A-Side 
 "Drifter" (Dennis Walks, Harry Mudie) - 3:45
 "Relax Baby Be Cool" - 3:52
 "Marilou Reggae Dub" - 5:02
 "Daisy Temple" - 4:34

B-Side 
 "Brigade des Stups" - 4:04
 "Elle est si" (Jacques Dutronc, Gainsbourg) - 1:15
 "Aux armes et cætera" (lyrics: Rouget de Lisle; music: Gainsbourg) - 3:51
 "Pas long feu" - 4:06
 "Les Locataires" - 4:26

C-Side 
 "Docteur Jekyll et Monsieur Hyde" - 3:38
 "Harley Davidson" - 4:57
 "Javanaise Remake" - 4:20
 "Des laids des laids" - 3:48
 "Vieille canaille (You Rascal You)" (lyrics: Jacques Plante; music: Sam Theard) - 3:17

D-Side 
 "Présentation des musiciens" - 2:00
 "Bonnie and Clyde" - 4:32
 "Lola rastaquouère" - 4:16
 "Aux armes et cætera" - 4:20

CD re-release 
 "Vieille canaille" - 3:46
 "Bonnie and Clyde" - 4:41
 "Docteur Jekyll et Monsieur Hyde" - 3:34
 "Aux armes et cætera" - 4:33
 "Brigade des Stups" - 4:17
 "Harley Davidson" - 5:08
 "Lola rastaquouère" - 4:24
 "Javanaise Remake" - 4:23
 "Des laids des laids" - 3:54
 "Pas long feu" - 5:03

2006 version

Disc 1 
 "Ouverture"
 "Drifter"
 "Relax Baby Be Cool"
 "Marilou Reggae Dub"
 "Daisy Temple"
 "Brigade des Stups"
 "Elle est si"
 "Aux armes et cætera"
 "Pas long feu"
 "J'aime bien les noirs" (interview)

Disc 2 
 "Docteur Jekyll et Monsieur Hyde"
 "Harley Davidson"
 "Javanaise Remake"
 "Des laids des laids"
 "Les Locataires"
 "Présentation des musiciens"
 "Bonnie and Clyde"
 "Vieille canaille"
 "Relax Baby Be Cool" (Instrumental)
 "Lola rastaquouère"
 "Bis"
 "Lola rastaquouère" (Previously Unreleased)
 "Aux armes et cætera" (Previously Unreleased)
 "Final"
 "La Marseillaise" (interview)

Personnel 
Serge Gainsbourg - vocals
Robbie Shakespeare - bass
Lowell "Sly" Dunbar - drums
Kay Williams, Michelle Jackson, Candy McKenzie - chorus
Michael "Mao" Chung - guitar
Radcliffe "Dougie" Bryan - rhythm guitar
Ansel Collins - keyboards
Uziah "Sticky" Thompson - percussion
Technical
Paul Scemama - recording
Geoffrey Chung - mixing
Jacques Aubert - front cover photography

References 

1980 live albums
Serge Gainsbourg albums
Reggae albums by French artists